Glen Johnson (born 7 March 1952) is an English former footballer who played in the Football League for Aldershot, Doncaster Rovers and Walsall.

References

External links
 Glenn Johnson stats at Neil Brown stat site

English footballers
English Football League players
1952 births
Living people
Arsenal F.C. players
Doncaster Rovers F.C. players
Walsall F.C. players
Aldershot F.C. players
Association football goalkeepers